Charles Ramsey  may refer to:
 Charles H. Ramsey (born 1950), Former Philadelphia police commissioner and DC police chief
Charles Ramsey (basketball) (born 1961), head coach of the Eastern Michigan Eagles men's basketball team from 2005 to 2011
Charles Frederic Ramsey (1915–1995), record producer
Charles Ramsey (Royal Navy officer) (1882–1966), British admiral
Chuck Ramsey (born 1952), American football player
Charles Ramsey, witness in the case of the Ariel Castro kidnappings

See also
Charles Ramsay (disambiguation)